Atwill is a surname. Notable people with the surname include:

 Lionel Atwill (1885–1946), English actor
 Henry Converse Atwill (1872–1936), American politician

See also
 Atwell (surname)